Netdisaster was a prank website that could simulate "disasters", such as meteors, UFOs, and spilled coffee, onto a screenshot of any given website. From February 8, 2005, to April 19, 2009, users of the website generated 111,669,334 disasters. The website won the Yahoo! UK & Ireland Finds of the Year 2005 award for Best Innovative Website.

History
Netdisaster creator Denis Rionnet registered the domain "netdisaster.com" on January 25, 2005. The online engine became available on at 3:00pm on February 8, 2005, with only five disasters available. Buzz about the website spread rapidly on the internet in the following months. On May 27, Rionnet added the "Netdisaster-Yourself" feature, which creates HTML codes for webmasters to allow their visitors to "destroy" their websites. By July 15, ten million disasters had been generated on the website.

On January 26, 2006, as a result of Netdisaster's growing popularity, the website was named the Yahoo! UK & Ireland Finds of the Year 2005 Best Innovative Website. In October 2007, a Led Zeppelin disaster was added as part of an online marketing campaign by Rubber Republic. In 2007, PC Magazine included it in their "Best of the Internet" list of websites. On August 6, 2008, one hundred million disasters had been generated.

Difficulties began on September 4, 2008, when RSA Security, a security issues company working for Yahoo!, threatened Netdisaster and its hosting provider, Lunarpages, with legal action, claiming that the "Text Sucker" disaster was being used for phishing. Per RSA's request, the website was shut down and Rionnet sent them the source code of the disaster engine. At that point, Netdisaster user Ronaldo Cardonetti of Abusando.org emailed the security company to tell them they had made a mistake. On October 6, 2008, RSA emailed Rionnet to apologize, after having realized their error. The website was brought back online about ten days later; however, users could no longer create disasters on any Yahoo! websites, nor could they share disasters they had created.

On April 20, 2009, Netdisaster received another legal threat, this time from eBay. eBay complained about a specific URL at netdisaster.com. The page, which showed the "Graffiti" disaster on the eBay website, was suspected of being used for phishing. Unlike Yahoo!, eBay did not examine the website's source code to verify their claim, and thus the website's engine is still offline. However, after receiving support and fan mail from hundreds of users, Rionnet decided that he couldn't stand for Netdisaster to be dead. He created a desktop version of the engine, which allows users to run many of the original disasters on a screenshot of their desktop instead of one of a website. He also made the original browser-based disasters available to webmasters who wanted to add them to their own sites with the "Netdisaster-Yourself!" tool.

On July 25, 2010, a fan-made extension for Google Chrome called "NetDisaster Loader" was posted to the Chrome Web Store that made the "Netdisaster-Yourself!" available for users to access on any website. This effectively made it possible for Chrome users to utilize Netdisaster in the same way they had before the engine was taken offline. The extension received a mention on the Netdisaster home page.

Use
Before the website's engine was shut down, users could choose from a list of disasters and the entire internet. Users could type in any URL, select a disaster from a drop-down list, and click "Go!". The disasters were divided into six categories, each one containing a variety of different options. Most of the disasters have been made available on the desktop application and the "Netdisaster-Yourself!" tool.

Nature
 Meteors
 Flood
 Flower Power

Technology
 Led Zeppelin *
 Nuke
 Mars Attacks!
 Graffiti
 Screenshaver
 Gun
 Bloody Gun
 Paintball
 Chainsaw

Life Forms
 Dinosaurs
 Wasps
 Flies
 Ants
 Snail
 Worms
 Mold

Home, Office
 Scribbling baby
 Fried Eggs
 Spilled Coffee
 Slow Burn
 Tomatoes
 Cream Pie

Miscellaneous
 Demonstration
 God Almighty
 Text Sucker*

Dirty
 Cow Dung
 Dog Poop
 Pee
 Acid Pee
 Vomit (yuk!)

*Not available on the desktop application or "Netdisaster-Yourself!" tool.

Notes

References

External links
 

Defunct websites
Internet properties established in 2005
Websites about animation